This is a list of best-selling automobiles in China since 2012, excluding imported models.

Overall bestsellers 

As of December 2020.

Class bestsellers 

As of December 2020.

Minicompact cars

Subcompact cars

Compact cars

Mid-size car

Full-size car

MPV (multi purpose vehicle)

SUV (sport utility vehicle)

Electric cars 

As of December 2020.

Brand bestsellers 

As of December 2022

References 

Articles with Chinese-language sources (zh)
Cars of China